Eduard Bernstein (6 January 1850 – 18 December 1932) was a German social democratic Marxist theorist and politician. A member of the Social Democratic Party of Germany (SPD), Bernstein had held close association to Karl Marx and Friedrich Engels, but he began to identify what he believed to be errors in Marxist thinking and began to criticize views held by Marxism when he investigated and challenged the Marxist materialist theory of history. He rejected significant parts of Marxist theory that were based upon Hegelian metaphysics and rejected the Hegelian perspective of an immanent economic necessity to socialism.

Early life 
Bernstein was born in Schöneberg (now part of Berlin) to Jewish parents who were active in the Reform Temple on the Johannistrasse whose services were performed on Sunday. His father was a locomotive driver. From 1866 to 1878, he was employed in banks as a banker's clerk after leaving school.

Bernstein's political career began in 1872, when he joined a socialist party with Marxist tendencies, known formally as the Social Democratic Workers' Party of Germany. The party was a proponent of the Eisenacher style of German socialism, named after the German town where it was founded. Bernstein soon became known as an activist. His party contested two elections against a rival socialist party, the Lassalleans (Ferdinand Lassalle's General German Workers' Association), but in both elections neither party was able to win a significant majority of the left-wing vote. Consequently, Bernstein, together with August Bebel and Wilhelm Liebknecht, prepared the Einigungsparteitag ("Unification Party Congress") with the Lassalleans in Gotha in 1875. Karl Marx's famous Critique of the Gotha Program criticized what he saw as a Lassallean victory over the Eisenachers, whom he favoured. Bernstein later noted that it was Liebknecht, considered by many to be the strongest Marxist advocate within the Eisenacher faction, who proposed the inclusion of many of the ideas that so thoroughly irritated Marx.

In the 1877 elections, the German Social Democratic Party (SPD) gained 493,000 votes. However, two assassination attempts on Kaiser Wilhelm I the next year provided Chancellor Otto von Bismarck a pretext to introduce a law banning all socialist organizations, assemblies and publications. There had been no Social Democratic involvement in either assassination attempt, but the popular reaction against "enemies of the Reich" induced a compliant Reichstag to approve Bismarck's Anti-Socialist Laws.

Bismarck's strict anti-socialist legislation was passed on 12 October 1878. For nearly all practical purposes the SPD was outlawed, and it was actively suppressed throughout Germany. However, it was still possible for Social Democrats to campaign as individuals for election to the Reichstag, which they did in spite of severe persecution. The party actually increased its electoral success, gaining 550,000 votes in 1884 and 763,000 in 1887.

Exile
The vehemence of Bernstein's opposition to the government of Bismarck made it desirable for him to leave Germany. Shortly before the Anti-Socialist Laws came into effect, Bernstein went into exile in Zurich, accepting a position as the private secretary of Karl Höchberg, a wealthy supporter of social democracy. A warrant subsequently issued for his arrest ruled out any possibility for him to return to Germany, and he was to remain in exile for more than 20 years. In 1888, Bismarck convinced the Swiss government to expel a number of important members of German social democracy and so Bernstein relocated to London, where he associated with Friedrich Engels and Karl Kautsky. It was soon after his arrival in Switzerland that he began to think of himself as a Marxist. In 1880, he accompanied Bebel to London to clear up a misunderstanding concerning his involvement with an article published by Höchberg that was denounced by Marx and Engels as being "chock-full of bourgeois and petty bourgeois ideas". The visit was a success, and Engels in particular was impressed by Bernstein's zeal and ideas.

Back in Zurich, Bernstein became increasingly active in working for Der Sozialdemokrat (Social Democrat) and later succeeded Georg von Vollmar as the paper's editor, which he was for 10 years. It was during those years between 1880 and 1890 that Bernstein established his reputation as a major party theoretician and a Marxist of impeccable orthodoxy. He was helped in that by the close personal and professional relationship he established with Engels. The relationship owed much to the fact that he shared Engels's strategic vision and accepted most of the particular policies that Engels believed the ideas to entail. In 1887, the German government persuaded the Swiss authorities to ban Der Sozialdemokrat. Bernstein moved to London, where he resumed publication from premises in Kentish Town. His relationship with Engels soon developed into friendship. He also communicated with various English socialist organizations, notably the Fabian Society and Henry Mayers Hyndman's Social Democratic Federation. In later years, his opponents routinely claimed that his "revisionism" was caused by seeing the world "through English spectacles". However, Bernstein denied the charges.

In 1895, Engels was deeply distressed when he discovered that his introduction to a new edition of The Class Struggles in France, written by Marx in 1850, had been edited by Bernstein and Kautsky in a manner that left the impression that he had become a proponent of a peaceful road to socialism. On 1 April 1895, four months before his death, Engels wrote to Kautsky: I was amazed to see today in the Vorwärts an excerpt from my 'Introduction' that had been printed without my knowledge and tricked out in such a way as to present me as a peace-loving proponent of legality quand même (at all costs). Which is all the more reason why I should like it to appear in its entirety in the Neue Zeit in order that this disgraceful impression may be erased. I shall leave Liebknecht in no doubt as to what I think about it and the same applies to those who, irrespective of who they may be, gave him this opportunity of perverting my views and, what's more, without so much as a word to me about it.

In 1891, Bernstein was one of the authors of the Erfurt Program and from 1896 to 1898, he published a series of articles entitled Probleme des Sozialismus (Problems of Socialism) that resulted in the revisionism debate in the SPD. He also published the book Die Voraussetzungen des Sozialismus und die Aufgaben der Sozialdemokratie (The Prerequisites for Socialism and the Tasks of Social Democracy) in 1899. The book was in great contrast to the positions of Bebel, Kautsky and Liebknecht. Rosa Luxemburg's 1900 essay Reform or Revolution? was also a polemic against Bernstein's position. In 1900, Bernstein published Zur Geschichte und Theorie des Sozialismus (The History and Theory of Socialism).

Return to Germany

In 1901, Bernstein returned to Germany after the end of the ban that had kept him from entering the country. He became an editor of the newspaper Vorwärts that year and a member of the Reichstag from 1902 to 1918. He voted against the armament tabling in 1913, together with the SPD fraction's left wing. Although he voted for war credits in August 1914, he opposed World War I from July 1915 and, in 1917, was among the founders of the Independent Social Democratic Party of Germany (USPD), which united antiwar socialists, including reformists like Bernstein, centrists like Kautsky and revolutionary socialists like Karl Liebknecht. He was a member of the USPD until 1919, when he rejoined the SPD. From 1920 to 1928, Bernstein was again a member of the Reichstag. On 4 March 1920, as an expert on Anglo-German relations under the German Empire, he became a member of the parliamentary committee investigating the war guilt question. He was one of only a few deputies on the committee to admit Germany's responsibility for the outbreak of war, setting himself apart from the majority of Reichstag members in the bourgeois parties. He retired from political life in 1928.

Death and legacy
Bernstein died on 18 December 1932 in Berlin. A commemorative plaque is placed in his memory at Bozener Straße 18, Berlin-Schöneberg, where he lived from 1918 until his death. His grave in the Eisackstrasse Cemetery became a grave of honour in Berlin.

Opinions

Opposition to violent revolution 
Die Voraussetzungen des Sozialismus (1899) was Bernstein's most significant work. Bernstein was principally concerned with refuting Karl Marx's predictions about the imminent and inevitable demise of capitalism and Marx's consequent laissez-faire policy which opposed ameliorative social interventions before the demise. Bernstein indicated simple facts, which he considered to be evidence that Marx's predictions were not being borne out while he noted that while the centralization of capitalist industry was significant, it was not becoming wholescale and that the ownership of capital was becoming more and not less diffuse. Bernstein's analysis of agriculture, according to which Bernstein believed that land ownership was becoming less concentrated, was largely based on the work of Eduard David and was in its marshalling of facts impressive enough that even his Orthodox Marxist opponent Karl Kautsky acknowledged its value.

As to Marx's belief in the disappearance of the middleman, Bernstein declared that the entrepreneur class was being steadily recruited from the proletariat class and so all compromise measures, such as the state regulation of the hours of labour and provisions for old-age pensions should be encouraged. For that reason, Bernstein urged the labouring classes to take an active interest in politics. Bernstein also indicated what he considered to be some of the flaws in Marx's labour theory of value.

Looking especially at the rapid growth in Germany, Bernstein argued that middle-sized firms would flourish, the size and power of the middle class would grow and that capitalism would successfully adjust and not collapse. He warned that a violent proletarian revolution, as in France in 1848, produced only reactionary successes, which undermined workers' interests. Therefore, he rejected revolution and instead insisted the best strategy to be patiently building up a durable social movement working for continuous nonviolent incremental change.

In his work, The Quest for Evolutionary Socialism: Eduard Bernstein and Social Democracy, Manfred Steger touches on Bernstein's desire for socialism through peaceful means and incremental legislation. Some say that is Marxism in its mature form after the revisionists claimed many of Marx's theories to be wrong and came up with theories of their own, including socialism coming through democratic means.

Bernstein's views under attack
Bernstein was vilified by the orthodox Marxists led by Karl Kautsky as well as the more radical current led by Rosa Luxemburg for his revisionism. Nonetheless, Bernstein remained very much a socialist, albeit an unorthodox one as he believed that socialism would be achieved by the advancement of capitalism to social democracy and so on, not by capitalism's destruction (as rights were gradually won by workers, their cause for grievance would be diminished and consequently, so too would the motivation for revolution). During the intra-party debates about his ideas, Bernstein explained that for him the final goal of socialism was nothing; progress toward that goal was everything.

Luxemburg argued that socialism has its end in social revolution and revisionism "amounts in practice to the advice [...] that we abandon the social revolution—the goal of Social Democracy—and turn social reform from a means of the class struggle into its final aim". She says revisionism has lost sight of scientific socialism and reverted to idealism and therefore lost its predictive force. Since reformists underestimate the anarchy of capitalism and say it has adaptability and viability, by which they mean that the contradictions of capitalism would not of historical necessity drive it to its doom, Luxemburg said they would abandon the objective necessity for socialism and give up all hope for a socialist future. The movement would collapse unless revisionism is repudiated. Trade unionists, who could see the successes of capitalism and the improvement of working conditions and who wanted to improve working conditions through parliament, generally followed Bernstein while those who were more orthodox generally followed Luxemburg.

Foreign policy 
Foreign policy was Bernstein's main intellectual interest between 1902 and 1914, with many articles in the Sozialistische Monatshefte (Socialist Monthly). He advocated policy positions for Germany that were aggressively nationalist, imperialist and expansionist.

Bernstein considered protectionism (high tariffs on imports) as helping only a selective few, being fortschrittsfeindlich (anti-progressive) for its negative effects on the masses. He argued Germany's protectionism was based only on political expediency, isolating Germany from the world (especially from Britain), creating an autarky that would result only in conflict between Germany and the rest of the world. Bernstein wanted to end Germany's protectionism and argued that tariffs did not increase grain production, did not counter British competition, did not increase farm profits and did not promote improvements in farming. Instead, it inflated rents, interest rates and prices, hurting everyone involved. In contrast, he argued that free trade led to peace, democracy, prosperity and the highest material and moral well-being of all humanity.

Bernstein rejected reactionary bourgeois nationalism and called instead for a cosmopolitan-libertarian nationalism. He recognized the historical role of the national factor and said that the proletariat must support their country against external dangers. He called on workers to assimilate themselves within nation-states, which entailed support for colonial policies and imperial projects. Bernstein was sympathetic to the idea of imperial expansions as a positive and civilizing mission, which resulted in a bitter series of polemics with the anti-imperialist Ernest Belfort Bax. Bernstein supported colonialism as he believed it uplifted backward peoples and it worked well for both Britain and Germany. Bernstein supported such policies in an intensely racialized manner, arguing in 1896 that "races who are hostile to or incapable of civilisation cannot claim our sympathy when they revolt against civilisation" and that the "savages [must] be subjugated and made to conform to the rules of higher civilisation". However, he was disturbed by the Kaiser's reckless policies. He wanted strong friendship especially with Britain and France and protection against the Russian threat to Germany. He envisioned a sort of league of nations.

Zionism 
Bernstein's views on Jewish matters evolved. He never identified as a Zionist, but after initially favouring a wholly assimilationist solution to "the Jewish Question", his attitude toward Zionism became considerably more sympathetic after World War I.

Homosexuality
Bernstein is also noted for being "one of the first socialists to deal sympathetically with the issue of homosexuality".

Works  
 Ferdinand Lassalle as a Social Reformer. Eleanor Marx Aveling, trans. London: Swan Sonnenschein & Co., 1893.
 Evolutionary Socialism: A Criticism and Affirmation. [1899] Edith C. Harvey, trans. New York: B.W. Huebsch, 1909. This book has also been translated into English as The Preconditions of Socialism.
 Cromwell and Communism: Socialism and Democracy in the Great English Revolution. H.J. Stenning, trans. London: Allen and Unwin, 1930.
 My Years of Exile: Reminiscences of a Socialist., trans. Bernard Miall, New York: Harcourt, Brace and Howe, 1921. online free
 Selected Writings of Eduard Bernstein, 1900–1921. Prometheus Books, 1996.
 Marius S. Ostrowski (ed.), Eduard Bernstein on Social Democracy and International Politics: Essays and Other Writings. Basingstoke: Palgrave Macmillan, 2018.
 Marius S. Ostrowski (ed.), Eduard Bernstein on the German Revolution: Selected Historical Writings. Basingstoke: Palgrave Macmillan, 2019.
 Marius S. Ostrowski (ed.), Eduard Bernstein on Socialism Past and Present: Essays and Lectures on Ideology. Basingstoke: Palgrave Macmillan, 2021.

Primary sources 
 Tudor, Henry Tudor and J. M. Tudor, eds. Marxism and Social Democracy: The Revisionist Debate, 1896–1898. Cambridge, England: Cambridge University Press, 1988.

References

Sources 
 Fletcher, Richard A. "Cobden as Educator: The Free-Trade Internationalism of Eduard Bernstein, 1899–1914." American Historical Review 88.3 (1983): 561–578. online
 Fletcher, R. A. "In the interest of peace and progress: Eduard Bernstein's socialist foreign policy." Review of International Studies 9.2 (1983): 79–93.
 Fletcher, Roger. "A Revisionist Looks at Imperialism: Eduard Bernstein's Critique of Imperialism and Kolonialpolitik, 1900–14." Central European History 12.3 (1979): 237–271.
 Fletcher, Roger. "Revisionism and Nationalism: Eduard Bernstein's Views on the National Question, 1900–1914." Canadian Review of Studies in Nationalism 11.1 (1984) pp 103–117.
 Fletcher, Roger. "World Power without War. Eduard Bernstein's Proposals for an Alternative Weltpolitik, 1900–1914." Australian Journal of Politics & History 25.2 (1979): 228–236.
 Fletcher, Roger. "An English Advocate in Germany. Eduard Bernstein’s Analysis of Anglo-German Relations 1900–1914." Canadian Journal of History 13.2 (1978): 209–236.
 Gay, Peter, The Dilemma of Democratic Socialism: Eduard Bernstein's challenge to Marx. (Columbia UP, 1952. online 
 Gustafsson, Bo. "A new look at Bernstein: Some reflections on reformism and history." Scandinavian Journal of History 3#1-4 (1978): 275–296.
 Hamilton, Richard F. Marxism, Revisionism, and Leninism: Explication, Assessment, and Commentary (Greenwood, 2000) online 
 Hulse, James W. Revolutionists in London: A Study of Five Unorthodox Socialists. (Clarendon Press, 1970.
 Ostrowski, Marius S. "Bernstein, Eduard." In Mortimer Sellers and Stephan Kirste (eds.), Encyclopedia of the Philosophy of Law and Social Philosophy (Springer, 2021) online
 Ostrowski, Marius S. "Eduard Bernstein and the Lessons of the German Revolution." In James Muldoon and Gaard Kets (eds.), The German Revolution and Political Theory (Palgrave Macmillan, 2019): 137–158. online
 Ostrowski, Marius S. "'Reform or revolution, redux: Eduard Bernstein on the 1918–19 German Revolution." Historical Research 95.268 (2022): 213–239. online
 Ostrowski, Marius S. "Social Democracy and "positive" foreign policy: The evolution of Eduard Bernstein's international thought, 1914–1920." History of Political Thought 42.3 (2021): 520–564. online
 Pachter, Henry. "The Ambiguous Legacy of Eduard Bernstein." Dissent 28#2 (1981). pp 203–216.
 Rogers, H. Kendall. Before the Revisionist Controversy: Kautsky, Bernstein, and the Meaning of Marxism, 1895–1898. (Routledge, 2015).
 Steger, Manfred B. The Quest for Evolutionary Socialism: Eduard Bernstein and Social Democracy. (Cambridge UP, 1997).
 Steger, Manfred. "Historical materialism and ethics: Eduard Bernstein's revisionist perspective." History of European ideas 14.5 (1992): 647–663.
 Thomas, Paul. Marxism & Scientific Socialism: From Engels to Althusser. (Routledge, 2008).

External links 

 
 
 Eduard Bernstein Archive at Marxists Internet Archive
 Bernstein on Homosexuality, Articles from Die Neue Zeit, 1895 and 1898
 Evolutionary Socialism: a Criticism and Affirmation: (Die Voraussetzungen Des Sozialismus und Die Aufgaben Der Sozialdemokratie) (Google Books)
 Archive of Eduard Bernstein Papers at the International Institute of Social History
 

1850 births
1932 deaths
European democratic socialists
Politicians from Berlin
People from the Province of Brandenburg
Jewish German politicians
Social Democratic Party of Germany politicians
Independent Social Democratic Party politicians
Members of the 10th Reichstag of the German Empire
Members of the 11th Reichstag of the German Empire
Members of the 13th Reichstag of the German Empire
Members of the Reichstag of the Weimar Republic
Reichsbanner Schwarz-Rot-Gold members
German Marxists
Marxist theorists
German anti-poverty advocates
Jewish socialists
19th-century German Jews
People from Schöneberg
Critics of dialectical materialism